Hell on Earth is a controversial heavy metal and industrial rock band whose songs include "Toilet Licking Maggot" and "Raped by the Virgin Mary". On stage, they have had sex with skinned calves and had fans drink a blended concoction of dead rats.  They hail from Tampa, Florida.

In 1996, the group released Biomechanical Ejaculations Of The Damned, featuring songs like "The AIDS Infested Blood Of Christ" and "Baptized In Semen". Their 2003 album is entitled All Things Disturbingly Sassy, featuring tunes like "Mrs. Potatohead" and "My God is Heroin."

In September 2003 lead singer BillY Tourtelot said the band accepted a terminally ill fan's request to die on stage during the band's concert scheduled for October 4, 2003 at The Brass Mug in Tampa, Florida.  Consequently, Florida Governor Jeb Bush and Florida Attorney General Charlie Crist announced that the band would be prosecuted for assisting with suicide.  In 2004, the Florida Senate, in response to the band's actions, passed a bill barring the "exploitation of self-murder" for "commercial or entertainment purposes," subsequently signed into law by Governor Bush.

Line-up
BillY Tourtelot - Vocals, guitar
Salva - Keyboards

Past line-up
Jonathan Lee (Acheron, The Autumn Offering) - Drums
Erin Fuller - Drums
Kyle Sokol - Bass
Cindy Sexton - Bass
M3 - Mike Walkowski - Guitar
Trent - Keyboard
Joe Gilardi - Guitar
Mike McCracken - Drums
Johnny Teabags - Guitar
Diego - Guitar
Spencer - Bass
Paul Lydic - Bass

References

External links 
 The band's website, including:
 News section
 The band's MySpace page
 Suicide concert coverage from the BBC

Musical groups from Tampa, Florida
Heavy metal musical groups from Florida
American industrial metal musical groups